Leptomonas moramango is a species of monoxenous trypanosomatid. It is known to parasitise Brachycera flies, and was first found in Madagascar.

References

Further reading

External links
 

Parasitic excavates
Parasites of Diptera
Trypanosomatida